Salamo Arouch (January 1, 1923 – April 26, 2009) was a Jewish Greek boxer, the Middleweight Champion of Greece (1938) and the All-Balkans Middleweight Champion (1939), who survived the Holocaust by boxing (over 200 bouts) for the entertainment of German Nazi officers in Auschwitz Concentration Camp. His story was portrayed in the 1989 film Triumph of the Spirit, starring Willem Dafoe as Arouch.

Biography

Salamo Arouch was born in 1923, in Thessaloniki, Greece, one of two sons in a family that also included three daughters. His father was a stevedore who nurtured his son's interest in boxing, teaching him when he was a child. He worked briefly with his father as a stevedore. Arouch said that when he was 14, he fought and won his first amateur boxing match  in 1937 in Maccabi Thessaloniki, a Jewish youth center and gymnasium. He also fought with the colors of Aris Thessaloniki. He won the Greek Middleweight Boxing Championship, and in 1939, won the All-Balkans Middleweight Championship, an achievement he was best known for. After compiling an undefeated record of 24 wins (24 knockouts), Arouch joined the Greek Army. While in the military he raised his boxing record to 2 wins (17 knockouts).

Entertainment at Auschwitz-Birkenau
In 1943, Arouch and his family were transported by boxcar and interned in German Nazi Auschwitz-Birkenau concentration camp in present day Poland. They arrived on May 15, 1943. In Auschwitz, where Arouch was tagged prisoner 136954, he said the commander sought boxers among the newly interned and, once assured of Arouch's abilities, set him to twice- or thrice-weekly boxing matches against other prisoners.

According to Arouch, he was undefeated at Auschwitz, though two matches he was forced to fight while recovering from dysentery ended in draws. Lodged with the other fighters forced to participate in these matches and paid in extra food or lighter work, Salamo fought 208 matches in his estimation, knowing that prisoners who lost would be sent to the gas chamber or shot. Fights generally lasted until one fighter went down or the Nazis got tired of watching. Arouch claimed he weighed about 135 pounds and often fought much larger men. Once, he finished off a 250-pound opponent in only 18 seconds.

Release from the concentration camps
Though Arouch survived the war, being released from Auschwitz on January 17, 1945, his parents and siblings did not. In 1945, he was transferred to Bergen-Belsen, where he worked performing slave labor until the allies liberated the camp. During a search for family at Bergen-Belsen concentration camp in April, 1945, he met Marta Yechiel, a 17-year-old survivor from his own hometown. With Yechiel, he immigrated to Israel and settled in Tel Aviv, where he managed a shipping firm. Arouch and Yechiel wed in November 1945 and raised a family of four.

After the war he gave inspirational speeches. Arouch's undefeated boxing record (1937–1955) ended on June 8, 1955, when he was knocked out in four rounds by Italy's Amleto Falcinelli in Tel Aviv.

Work on the biographical film, Triumph of the Spirit
Arouch was a consultant on the movie, Triumph of the Spirit, the 1989 dramatic reenactment of his early life. He accompanied filmmakers several times on an emotional return to the concentration camp where large portions of the film were actually produced. The film takes some artistic liberties with the biographical details of his life, including the renaming of his wife and placing her in his story prior to internment.

After the movie came out, another Jewish boxer from Salonika, Jacques "Jacko" Razon, sued Arouch and the filmmakers for more than $20 million claiming that they had stolen his story and that Arouch had exaggerated his exploits. The case was later settled for US$30,000.

Arouch lived in Tel Aviv, Bat Yam and Rishon LeZion and died on April 26, 2009. He had been weakened by a stroke he suffered around 1994 and had been in declining health for six months prior to his death.

Professional boxing record (career highlights)

See also
List of Jewish athletes
Sports in Israel

References

External links
 Salamo Arouch-Daily Telegraph obituary
 Salamo Arouch biography at Box Rec
 

Jews from Thessaloniki
Greek Jews
Greek male boxers
Jewish boxers
Middleweight boxers
Auschwitz concentration camp survivors
Greek emigrants to Mandatory Palestine
20th-century Israeli businesspeople
Israeli Jews
Israeli people of Greek-Jewish descent
1923 births
2009 deaths
Auschwitz boxers